Stenoma heteroxantha is a moth in the family Depressariidae. It was described by Edward Meyrick in 1931. It is found in Paraguay and Brazil.

References

Moths described in 1931
Taxa named by Edward Meyrick
Stenoma